"The Oogum Boogum Song" was originally performed by Brenton Wood. It was released in 1967 on the album Oogum Boogum. It was written by Wood (under his real name, Alfred Smith).

History
The song peaked at number 34 in the US Billboard Hot 100 chart and number 19 R&B.  It was also a hit on the Canadian R&B chart, where it reached number 9.

In popular culture
"The Oogum Boogum Song" ends the film Devil's Due and is featured on the soundtrack of the 2018 movie, Love, Simon and the 2000 movie, Almost Famous. It is also featured in the 2022 movies Don't Worry Darling and The Gray Man. In television, the song appears in season 3, episode 7 of Sex Education and Season 3, episode 2 of The Umbrella Academy.

Chart performance

References

External links
 

1967 singles
1967 songs
Mushroom Records singles
Brenton Wood songs